The following countries and squadrons operated the Hawker Sea Hawk:

Operators

German Navy - Marineflieger
Marinefliegergeschwader 1
Marinefliegergeschwader 2

Indian Navy - Indian Naval Air Arm
300 Naval Air Squadron
551 Naval Air Squadron

Royal Netherlands Navy - Dutch Naval Aviation Service
No. 3 Squadron
No. 860 Squadron

Royal Navy - Fleet Air Arm

See also
Hawker Sea Hawk

References

Citations

Bibliography

Hawker Sea Hawk
Sea Hawk
Hawker aircraft